The Education of Max Bickford is an American drama television series that aired Sundays at 8:00 pm (EST) on CBS from September 23, 2001, to June 2, 2002, during the 2001–02 television season. After a strong initial launch, the show's audience 'dropped sharply afterward' despite its prime time slot following 60 Minutes. Within a month, two of its three executive producers were removed and reports claimed the show was being 'overhauled', though CBS denied this, preferring the term 'creative adjustments'. In May 2002, Touched by an Angel was returned to its Sunday 8:00 pm slot, bumping the second-to-last episode of The Education of Max Bickford to Monday. In June 2002, the final episode aired and the show was not renewed.

Overview
The series starred Richard Dreyfuss as the title character, a college professor of American Studies at Chadwick College, an all-women's school in Massachusetts. The series follows Max, a recovering alcoholic trying to rebuild his life, as he tries to prove that his teachings still carry relevance to a generation far different from his own. Often Max finds himself challenged by the faculty over his unorthodox style and his often cantankerous personality. Also starring was child actor Eric Ian Goldberg, who portrayed the young Lester Bickford, Max's son. Max's colleagues included Marcia Gay Harden as Andrea Haskell, his former student (and lover) who had recently joined the faculty, and Helen Shaver as his best friend, Erica, previously known as Steve before her transition. Max's daughter, Nell, played by Katee Sackhoff, attended the college.

Cast

Main
 Richard Dreyfuss – Max Bickford
 Marcia Gay Harden – Andrea Haskell
 Regina Taylor – Judith Bryant
 Helen Shaver – Erica Bettis
 Katee Sackhoff – Nell Bickford
 Eric Ian Goldberg – Lester Bickford
 Meredith Roberts – Brenda Vanderpool
 Molly Regan – Lorraine Tator
 Stephen Spinella – Rex Pinsker
 David McCallum – Walter Thornhill

Recurring
 Jayne Atkinson – Lyla Ortiz
 Stefanie Bari – Anna
 Natalie Venetia Belcon – Rose Quigley
 Craig Bonacorsi – Adam
 Brennan Brown – Ron Zinn
 Lynn Collins
 Angel Desai – Jardie
 Ylfa Edelstein – Isabelle
 Angela Goethals – Danielle Hodges
 Donna Murphy – Esther Weber
 Coté de Pablo – Gina
 Ellen Parker – Noleen Bettis
 Robin Raven
 Kristen Schaal – Valerie Holmes
 Chris Stack – Alec
 Kellee Stewart – Yolanda

Episodes

References

External links
 
 

2000s American drama television series
2001 American television series debuts
2001 American television series endings
CBS original programming
Television series by CBS Studios
Television series by 20th Century Fox Television
Television shows set in Massachusetts
Transgender-related television shows
2000s American LGBT-related drama television series